Masorah or Mesorah refers either to the transmission of Jewish religious tradition, or to the tradition itself, and may refer to:

 The Hebrew vowel points also known as niqqud.
 Masoretic Text, the authoritative text of the Tanakh for Rabbinic Judaism
 Masoretes, scribes who passed down the Masoretic text
 Masortim or Shomer Masores, meaning "traditional", semi-observant Jews in Israel
 "Masorti Judaism" since 1990, another name for Conservative Judaism
 "Mesora", a variant pronunciation for "Metzora (parashah)"
 "Mesorah Publications Ltd.", publishers of ArtScroll
 Torah Umesorah – National Society for Hebrew Day Schools, a Haredi American educational network
 Masora River - a small river in Mahanoro District, Atsinanana, Madagascar